Roberto López (born 5 April 1968) is a Mexican former professional tennis player.

López, who played at Wimbledon in the juniors, began on the professional tour in the late 1980s. He had a best singles world ranking of 355 and was a quarter-finalist at the 1989 San Luis Potosi Challenger. His only Challenger title came in doubles, when he teamed up with Alain Lemaitre to win at Bogota in 1989.

ATP Challenger finals

Doubles: 1 (1–0)

References

External links
 
 

1968 births
Living people
Mexican male tennis players
20th-century Mexican people